KFLQ (91.5 FM) is a Christian radio station located in Albuquerque, New Mexico. It is part of the Family Life Radio network.

History

The All-Indian Pueblo Council filed for a noncommercial radio station in Albuquerque in December 1973, later changing its name to the Albuquerque Public Broadcasting Corporation. Before launch, the council said that the station would feature multicultural and multilingual programming, including Spanish-language shows and English-language programming aimed at an African American audience. One employee of the Bureau of Indian Affairs fretted that so few Native Americans had FM radios that none of the station's target audience would be able to receive it, saying, "I don't like this business of having FM stations". In addition to the All-Indian Pueblo Council, a grant from the Department of Housing, Education and Welfare was used to start KIPC. While originally scheduled to sign on November 1, 1975, it did not do so until February 2, 1976. The station carried an eclectic mix of programs including NPR offerings, jazz music, and Albuquerque city council meetings, as well as a morning show called "Sound of the Drum" featuring "music of all Indians".

However, KIPC had trouble raising the operating funds to stay on the air. By September 1977, it had gone off the air while it worked to raise money, leaving the University of New Mexico's KUNM-FM to emerge as the major public radio station for the city. Albuquerque Public Broadcasting Corporation entered bankruptcy that same year. Two years later, the station was finally sold to Spindizzy PubCom and became KKTU. Spindizzy had also obtained the construction permit for KQIV at 91.9 MHz in Corpus Christi, Texas, and both stations were sold to Family Life Radio in 1982 for $120,000. On August 6 of that year, the station changed its call letters to KNFR, opting to change again to the present KFLQ on November 29, 1982.

References

External links

FCC History Cards for KFLQ

FLQ
FLQ
Family Life Radio stations